The Junior A Mountaineers Lacrosse Club was established in 2006 as an expansion team to the Rocky Mountain Lacrosse League (RMLL) Junior A program bringing the total number of Junior A lacrosse teams in Alberta to four.  Playing out of Calgary, the Mounties home rink is Stu Peppard.  The Mounties have played in 2 Minto Cup Championships, once being hosted in 2008 at Max Bell Arena

The Jr.A Mountaineers were the 2012 Alberta Champions and were one of the only Alberta based teams to reach the Semi-Finals in the Minto Cup.  They did so in 2008 and lost to the Victoria Jr.A Shamrocks with the Orangeville Northmen eventually winning the Championship.

The Mountaineers have also built their NCAA and college player recruits since their inception in 2006.  Below is a list of all former Alumni and current players who have played collegiate level lacrosse.

References

Lacrosse teams in Alberta
Sports teams in Calgary
2006 establishments in Alberta
Lacrosse clubs established in 2006